Auziņš (feminine: Auziņa) is a Latvian masculine surname, derived from the Latvian word for "oats" (auzas). Individuals with the surname include:

Aleksejs Auziņš (1910–1997), Latvian footballer
Igor Auzins (born 1949), Australian filmmaker
Imants Auziņš (1937-2013), Latvian poet and literary critic
Mārcis Auziņš (born 1956), Latvian physicist

Latvian-language masculine surnames